Nungarin is a town located in the north east of the Wheatbelt region of Western Australia, approximately  east of Perth and  north of Merredin. It is the main town in the Shire of Nungarin. At the 2006 census, Nungarin had a population of 142.

The surrounding areas produce wheat and other cereal crops. The town is a receival site for Cooperative Bulk Handling.

History

In October 1910,  at Avon Location 14227 and 14230 were set aside as a townsite reserve along the Dowerin to Merredin railway. The townsite itself was gazetted in 1912.

The local hall was being built in 1919, and was open by the following year.

A large fire in 1922 destroyed Messrs Thomas and Thick's store along with the post office branch and the manager's residence of the Nungarin Farmers Cooperative Society. It was not known what caused the fire, which caused damage estimated at £12,000. The Farmers Cooperative reopened in the hall and the post office moved to the station building.

In 1932 the Wheat Pool of Western Australia announced that the town would have two grain elevators, each fitted with an engine, installed at the railway siding. Construction of the bins for the bulk handling of wheat commenced late in 1933 with 30 men employed to complete the work.

During World War II it was an important army ordnance camp – 5 Base Ordnance Depot was established at the Nungarin Army Depot and Workshop. The site for the Army Depot was apparently selected as it was outside the range of Japanese carrier-based aircraft, and was readily accessible by the rail network.

In 1946 a number of fires damaged army property.

In the post-war era it was a site of large disposal sales.
The former army camp is now the site of the Nungarin Heritage Machinery and Army Museum.  The former Nungarin railway station building has been relocated to the Bennett Brook Railway at Whiteman Park in Perth.

Newspapers 

Local newspapers included:

 Nungarin Trayning Mail and Kununoppin Advertiser (1917–1922)
 Nungarin Standard (1934-1939)
 Dampier Herald and Nungarin Standard (1943-1958)

Politics

References

External links

Nungarin, Western Australia
Wheatbelt (Western Australia)
Grain receival points of Western Australia
Populated places established in the 1910s
1910s establishments in Australia